Dutiful but Dumb is a 1941 short subject directed by Del Lord starring American slapstick comedy team The Three Stooges (Moe Howard, Larry Fine and Curly Howard). It is the 54th entry in the series released by Columbia Pictures starring the comedians, who released 190 shorts for the studio between 1934 and 1959.

Plot
The Stooges are Click, Clack and Cluck, paparazzi-like photographers working for Whack Magazine ("If it's a good picture, it's out of Whack!"). After failing in their attempts to get a photo of movie star Percival De Puyster and his new bride, their boss Mr. Wilson (Vernon Dent) fires them. But Wilson changes his mind and instead sends the Stooges to Vulgaria (an obvious parody of fascist  (Bulgaria) for their next job, knowing full well that taking pictures in Vulgaria is against the law (mainly because  photography is considered a form of espionage) and punishable by death. The inept trio arrive and inadvertently let another photographer who was to be shot escape. The Stooges themselves try to escape but end up running into a Vulgarian prison. As the firing squad is setting up for the Stooges' execution, Curly requests one last smoke, leading to him pulling out a cigar the length of a hero sandwich. After he finishes it, the firing squad open fire, but the trio run off with their heads inside their shirts.

Three Vulgarian officers watch a demonstration of their country's new ray gun which can fire other guns remotely. When they hear of the Stooges' escape, they leave the officer's office. The Stooges soon arrive in the office and discover the ray gun, which they think is a new camera. But when Moe and Larry pose in front of the gun, Curly manages to shoot their belts and hats off. The Stooges hide as they hear the officers returning, with Curly taking refuge inside the radio, destroying the wiring in the process. When the officers try to turn on the radio, Curly pulls out a large harmonica and begins playing, while strumming the remaining wires like a harp and banging inside the radio with xylophone mallets. The officers discover Curly, who jumps out of a window to escape. Moe and Larry trap the officers' heads in the window while Curly hits the officers in the head with his mallets.

The Stooges are now dressed in the Vulgarian officers' uniforms and end up in a local cafe, in which Curly pits his wits against a strong drink, and then a defiant oyster in his stew. When the oyster works Curly's last nerve, he pulls out his gun and fires at it repeatedly. This gets the attention of the guards, who promptly capture the Stooges and literally carry them off, upside down, on the bayonets of their guns.

Cast

Credited
 Moe Howard as Moe Click
 Larry Fine as Larry Clack
 Curly Howard as Curly Cluck

Uncredited
 Vernon Dent as Mr. Wilson
 Edmund Cobb as Wilson's Assistant
 Neal Burns as Photographer in Hallway 
 Stanley Brown as Percival DePuyster 
 Marjorie Deanne as Mrs. DePuyster
 George Gray as Frightened man in Hallway 
 Blanca Vischer as Wilson's Secretary 
 Harry Semels as Villager
 Bud Jamison as Vulgarian Sergeant
 George Ovey as Civilian Photographer
 Fred Aldrich as Firing Squad Soldier 
 Fred Kelsey as Vulgarian Colonel
 Eddie Laughton as Ray Machine Operator 
 Bruce Bennett as Vulgarian Soldier in Colonel's Office 
 Bert Young as Vulgarian Sentry
 Kit Guard as Vulgarian Sentry 
 Chester Conklin as Counterman
 Al Thompson as Vulgarian soldier in Restaurant
 Charlie Phillips as Vulgarian soldier in Restaurant
 Joe Palma as Vulgarian soldier in Restaurant

Production notes
Dutiful But Dumb was filmed on August 1–5, 1940; the film title is a play on "beautiful but dumb."

An adaptation of the oyster soup battle is featured in The Three Stooges video game, where players control Curly, who attempts to pick up and eat as many crackers from the oyster soup as possible before the oysters do. Oysters occasionally fire soup at Curly. The gag was later performed by Moe in 1948's Shivering Sherlocks and Larry who fights the Lobster Gumbo in 1954's Income Tax Sappy. The gag also appears in the 1945 Abbott and Costello film, Here Come the Co-Eds.

References

External links
 
 
Dutiful But Dumb at threestooges.net

1941 films
1941 comedy films
1941 short films
The Three Stooges films
American black-and-white films
Films set in Europe
Films directed by Del Lord
Columbia Pictures short films
American slapstick comedy films
Films about photographers
1940s English-language films
1940s American films